Kati is an urban commune and the largest town in Mali's Koulikoro Region. The town is situated 15 km northwest of Bamako, Mali's capital, on the Dakar-Niger Railway. In the 2009 census, the commune had a population of 114,983.

History
Kati was the site of Camp Gallieni, where the 2nd Regiment of Senegalese Tirailleurs was garrisoned. On 13 May 1934 a war memorial was dedicated to dead from the First World War and the conquest of Sudan. After Mali became independent, the French Armed Forces left Kati on 8 June 1961. The Malian Army founded a military school at the base.

Economy

Kati is the capital of the cercle of Kati. It is also a garrison city. The town has both a military hospital and a civil hospital. The town has several teaching facilities (many fundamental schools and a college). A youth club and arts centre were created with the support of the French co-operation.

Kati is a thriving market town. An important cattle market takes place every week. Kati is located on the Dakar-Niger Railway and on the road Bamako-Kolokani and Kati-Négéla-Kita.

Demographics

The population is mainly Muslim, but with the presence of a Roman Catholic mission the Roman-Catholic community is also well established.

The population of Kati speaks primarily Bambara locally called Bamanankan.

Society and government

Since 2009, the mayor of Kati has been Hamalla Haidara. It is represented in the National Assembly of Mali by Gouagnon Coulibaly.

It appears to have the headquarters of the 3rd Military Region of the Military of Mali.

2004 CAOMJ Meetings
From December 27, 2004 to December 30, 2004, the "Coordination des associations, organisations et mouvements de la jeunesse de Kati" organinized a meeting for young people from Mali, Burkina Faso, Guinea, Côte d'Ivoire, Senegal and Togo. The previous meeting took place in December 2003 in Bobo-Dioulasso in Burkina Faso. 
The young people had committed themselves to contribute their share to find a solution for the problems their countries are facing, like health of the reproduction of young people and teenagers, AIDS, advancing of the desert, wars, illiteracy etcetera. The meeting of Kati focused on the role of young people in the reinforcement of African integration and their role in the fight against the turning of their countries into a desert.

International relations

Twin towns – Sister cities
Kati is twinned with:
  Puteaux, France (since 1985)
  Erfurt, Germany (since 2011)

Climate
Köppen-Geiger climate classification system classifies its climate as tropical wet and dry (Aw). The rainy season takes place in mid-year, from June to September. From July to September, it is the rainiest and the daytime temperatures are the least hot. Its hottest months are from February to May with average maximum temperatures above .

Notable natives
 Chris Seydou, couturier.
 Doumbi Fakoly, writer.
 Mamadou Konaté, politician.
 Sadio Camara, military officer.

See also
 Railway stations in Mali
 List of cities in Mali

References

External links
.

Communes of Koulikoro Region